This article discusses the phonological system of the Greenlandic language.

Vowels 

Double vowels are analyzed as two morae and so they are phonologically a vowel sequence and not a long vowel. They are also orthographically written as two vowels. There is only one diphthong, which occurs only at the ends of words.

For example:

  "husband" pronounced .
  "(s)he has a husband" pronounced  and written .
  "house" pronounced .
  "(s)he has a house" pronounced  and written .

Nonetheless, still there are some minimal pairs of the lowering allophony, in the case of ⟨rC⟩:  "gun"  vs.  "February" .

Consonants 
Greenlandic has consonants at five points of articulation: labial, alveolar, palatal, velar and uvular. It distinguishes stops, fricatives, and nasals at the labial, alveolar, velar, and uvular points of articulation. The labiodental fricative  is contrastive only in loanwords. The alveolar stop  is pronounced as an affricate  before the high front vowel .

Phonotactics 
Consonant clusters occur only over syllable boundaries, and their pronunciation is subject to regressive assimilations that convert them into geminates. All non-nasal consonants in a cluster are voiceless.

Prosody 
Greenlandic prosody does not include stress as an autonomous category; instead, prosody is determined by tonal and durational parameters. Intonation is influenced by syllable weight: heavy syllables are pronounced in a way that may be perceived as stress. Heavy syllables include syllables with long vowels and syllables before consonant clusters. The last syllable is stressed in words with fewer than four syllables and without long vowels or consonant clusters. The antepenultimate syllable is stressed in words with more than four syllables that are all light. In words with many heavy syllables, syllables with long vowels are considered heavier than syllables before a consonant cluster.

Geminate consonants are pronounced long, almost exactly with the double duration of a single consonant.

Intonation in indicative clauses usually rises on the antepenultimate syllable, falls on the penult and rises on the last syllable. Interrogative intonation rises on the penultimate and falls on the last syllable.

Morphophonology 
Greenlandic phonology distinguishes itself phonologically from the other Inuit languages by a series of assimilations.

Greenlandic phonology allows clusters of two consonants, but phonetically, the first consonant in a cluster is assimilated to the second one resulting in a geminate consonant. Geminate  is pronounced . Geminate  is pronounced . Geminate  is pronounced . Geminate  is pronounced  and written .

And the word Inuktitut itself, when translated into Kalaallisut, becomes .

When an affix beginning with a consonant is added to a stem that ends in a consonant, the following rules apply (C¹ refers to the final consonant of the stem, C² to the initial consonant of the affix):

  becomes  .
 becomes .
  becomes  , except for *  and *  which become  .

To summarise:  → , otherwise  → .

The vowel  of modern Greenlandic is the result of a historic merger of the Proto-Eskimo–Aleut vowels *i and *ɪ. The fourth vowel was still present in Old Greenlandic, as attested by Hans Egede. In modern West Greenlandic, the difference between the two original vowels can be discerned morphophonologically only in certain environments. The vowel that was originally *ɪ has the variant  when preceding another vowel and sometimes disappears before certain suffixes.

The degree to which the assimilation of consonant clusters has taken place is an important dialectal feature separating Polar Eskimo, Inuktun, which still allows some ungeminated consonant clusters, from West and East Greenlandic. Thus, for example, the East Greenlandic name of a particular town is Ittoqqortoormiit, which would appear as Illoqqortoormiut in Kalaallisut.

See also 
 Inuit phonology

References

Sources
 
 
 
 
 
 
 
 
 

Greenlandic language
Native American phonologies